Nikolay Fyodorovich Gikalo (March 8, 1897 – April 25, 1938) was a Ukrainian Soviet revolutionary and statesman.

He was born in Odessa into a Ukrainian peasant family. From 1915 he served in the Russian Imperial Army, in 1917 he joined the Russian Social Democratic Labour Party (Bolsheviks). He commanded the Red Army in the fight against the White Army in the Northern Caucasus. He was first secretary of the Communist Party of Uzbekistan from April 1929 to June 11, 1929, first secretary of the Communist Party of Azerbaijan from 1929 to August 1930, first secretary of the Communist Party of Byelorussia from January 18, 1932 to March 18, 1937. During the Great Purge, Gikalo was arrested, accused of plotting against the Soviet state, sentenced to death and executed on April 25, 1938. He was exonerated posthumously in 1955.

A city in Chechnya is named after him.

See also
Azerbaijan Communist Party

References

External links

Гикало Николай Федорович at www.hrono.ru

1897 births
1938 deaths
Politicians from Odesa
People from Odessky Uyezd
Russian Social Democratic Labour Party members
Old Bolsheviks
Central Committee of the Communist Party of the Soviet Union candidate members
First Secretaries of the Communist Party of Uzbekistan
First secretaries of the Azerbaijan Communist Party
Heads of the Communist Party of Byelorussia
Politburo of the Central Committee of the Communist Party of Ukraine (Soviet Union) members
Ukrainian revolutionaries
Ukrainian people of World War I
Russian military personnel of World War I
Soviet military personnel of the Russian Civil War
Recipients of the Order of Lenin
Recipients of the Order of the Red Banner
Executed politicians
Great Purge victims from Ukraine
Soviet rehabilitations
Recipients of the Cross of St. George